Patrick Nagel (1945–1984) was an American artist.

Patrick Nagel may also refer to:
 Patrick Nagel (footballer) (born 1990), German footballer

See also
Pat Nagle (born 1987), ice hockey player